Scheherazade is a major female character and the storyteller in the frame narrative of the Middle Eastern collection of tales known as the One Thousand and One Nights.

Name 

the Encyclopædia Iranica. Muhsin Mahdi's critical edition has .

The spelling Scheherazade first appeared in English-language texts in 1801, borrowed from German usage.

Narration 

The story goes that the monarch Shahryar, on discovering that his first wife was unfaithful to him, resolved to marry a new virgin every day and to have her beheaded the next morning before she could dishonour him. Eventually the vizier could find no more virgins of noble blood and, against her father's wishes, Scheherazade volunteered to marry the king.

Sir Richard Burton's translation of The Nights describes Scheherazade in this way:

Once in the king's chambers, Scheherazade asked if she might bid one last farewell to her beloved younger sister, Dunyazad, who had secretly been prepared to ask Scheherazade to tell a story during the long night. The king lay awake and listened with awe as Scheherazade told her first story. The night passed by, and Scheherazade stopped in the middle. The king asked her to finish, but Scheherazade said there was no time, as dawn was breaking. So the king spared her life for one day so she could finish the story the next night. The following night Scheherazade finished the story and then began a second, more exciting tale, which she again stopped halfway through at dawn. Again, the king spared her life for one more day so that she could finish the second story.

Thus the king kept Scheherazade alive day by day, as he eagerly anticipated the conclusion of each previous night's story. At the end of 1,001 nights, and 1,000 stories, Scheherazade finally told the king that she had no more tales to tell him and asked to be able to say goodbye to the three sons she had given him during those years. During the preceding 1,001 nights, however, the king had fallen in love with Scheherazade. He spared her life and made her his queen.

See also 
 Scheherazade in popular culture

References

External links 

 The Arabian Nights Entertainments—Project Gutenberg

Female characters in literature
Fictional queens
Fictional storytellers
One Thousand and One Nights characters
Persian mythology
Medieval legends